The Holy Union Sisters, officially known as the Sisters of La Sainte Union Des Sacrés-Coeurs (the Holy Union of the Sacred Hearts), are a religious congregation of the Roman Catholic Church founded at Douai, France, in 1828, by Father Jean Baptiste Debrabant (1801 - 1889).

The congregation was approved by the Holy See in 1877.

Its rules are taken principally from those of the Order of the Visitation of Holy Mary, founded by Francis of Sales.

Education 

The Sisters devote themselves to the education of youth and have founded schools in multiple countries. Some of these schools are still run by the Sisters today.

References

External links
 Holy Union Sisters

Catholic female orders and societies
Religious organizations established in 1828
Catholic religious institutes established in the 19th century
1828 establishments in France